Eliashiv Ben-Horin (born 1921, Upper Silesia) was an Israeli Diplomat who served as Ambassador to Burma, Nepal and Sri Lanka (Non-Resident, Naypyidaw 1960 - 1963), Venezuela with a concurrent appointment in Trinidad and Tobago and Jamaica (1963-1967), West Germany (1970-1974), Belgium, Luxembourg and the European Economic Community (1974 - 1978)

Biography
He and his family emigrated to Palestine in 1935.  After studying law in London and Jerusalem as well as serving in both the Israeli and British armies, Ben-Horin entered the Foreign Service in 1950.

Munich Olympics
Ben-Horin was the Israeli Ambassador to West Germany during the hostage crisis at the 1972 Munich Olympics.  As a result, “he was the first official Israeli representative to meet with the negotiating team ... (keeping) the diplomatic channels open for both formal and informal messages.”

References

Ambassadors of Israel to Belgium
Ambassadors of Israel to Germany
Ambassadors of Israel to Nepal
Ambassadors of Israel to Venezuela
Polish emigrants to Mandatory Palestine
Ambassadors of Israel to Myanmar
Ambassadors of Israel to Sri Lanka
Ambassadors of Israel to Luxembourg
Ambassadors of Israel to Jamaica
Ambassadors of Israel to Trinidad and Tobago
1921 births
Year of death missing